Ben Nowell is a New Zealand Rugby union player who plays for the New Zealand Sevens team.

Career highlights
New Zealand Sevens 2007–present
Crusaders wider training squad 2007, 2008
Canterbury Sevens 2007, 2008
Canterbury A 2005 - 2007
Canterbury Colts 2005

References
 Sevens Profile

New Zealand rugby union players
1985 births
Living people
Rugby union players from Christchurch